The 2017 Tipperary Senior Football Championship was the 127th edition of the Tipperary GAA's premier club Gaelic football tournament for senior graded teams in County Tipperary, Ireland. The tournament consisted of 16 teams with the winner going on to represent Tipperary in the Munster Senior Club Football Championship. The championship began with a Group stage before proceeding to a knock-out format.

Loughmore-Castleiney were the defending champions after they defeated Moyle Rovers in the previous years final.

This was Fethard's first ever year in the senior grade after claiming the 2016 Tipperary Intermediate Football Championship title, however they will drop back to the I.F.C. for 2018 after losing the Relegation final. They will be replaced by I.F.C. champions Kiladangan.

Team Changes
The following teams have changed division since the 2016 championship season.

To S.F.C.
Promoted from 2016 Tipperary Intermediate Football Championship
 Fethard  -  (Intermediate Champions)

From S.F.C.
Relegated to 2017 Tipperary Intermediate Football Championship
 Thomas MacDonaghs

Format
The 16 teams are drawn into random groups of four. The top two teams automatically enter the knock-out stages. Should a team finish third or fourth in their group but win their regional championship (West Tipperary S.F.C./Mid Tipperary S.F.C./South Tipperary S.F.C.), they will be re-instated into the county series in a Preliminary Quarter-Final in a random draw against any of the second placed teams.

Regional Champions
West Tipperary S.F.C. Final:
 Arravale Rovers 4-10, 2-10 Galtee Rovers, Annacarty, 2/9/2017,

Mid Tipperary S.F.C. Final:
 Loughmore/Castleiney 0-17, 0-6 Upperchurch/Drombane, Littleton, 9/9/2017,

South Tipperary S.F.C. Final:
 Clonmel Commercials 0-8, 0-8 Moyle Rovers, Clonmel, 7/1/2018, (A.E.T.), 
(Final never re-fixed; competition incomplete)

Group stage 
	

All 16 teams enter the competition at this stage. The top 2 teams in each group go into the Quarter-Finals while the bottom team of each group will enter a Relegation Playoff.

Group A

Round 1
 Drom & Inch 2-11, 1-13 JK Brackens, 7/5/2017,
 Killenaule 3-17, 2-12 Kilsheelan-Kilcash, 7/5/2017, 

Round 2
 JK Brackens 1-14, 2-10 Kilsheelan-Kilcash, 23/5/2017, 
 Killenaule 2-22, 2-9 Drom & Inch, 24/5/2017, 

Round 3
 Kilsheelan-Kilcash 2-8, 0-8 Drom & Inch, 16/6/2017,
 Killenaule 1-13, 0-13 JK Brackens, 17/6/2017,

Group B

Round 1
 Arravale Rovers 2-12, 2-10 Fethard, 6/5/2017, 
 Moyle Rovers 2-14, 0-6 Aherlow Gaels, 7/5/2017, 

Round 2
 Moyle Rovers 0-15, 1-7 Arravale Rovers, 24/5/2017, 
 Aherlow Gaels 0-12, 0-12 Fethard, 24/5/2017,

Round 3
 Moyle Rovers 0-13, 0-8 Fethard, 16/6/2017,
 Aherlow Gaels 4-11, 1-10 Arravale Rovers, 17/6/2017,

Group C

Round 1
 Galtee Rovers 3-10, 0-12 Ardfinnan, 7/5/2017, 
 Loughmore Castleiney -vs- Éire Óg Annacarty,

Round 2
 Loughmore-Castleiney 2-13, 1-8 Galtee Rovers, 24/5/2017, 
 Éire Óg Annacarty 0-13, 0-11 Ardfinnan, 24/5/2017,

Round 3
 Loughmore-Castleiney 3-19, 2-5 Ardfinnan, 16/6/2017,
 Éire Óg Annacarty 0-14, 0-8 Galtee Rovers, 18/6/2017, Report

Group D

Round 1
 Ballyporeen 1-10, 0-12 Upperchurch-Drombane, 6/5/2017,
 Clonmel Commercials 0-21, 3-8 Cahir, 7/5/2017,  

Round 2
 Clonmel Commercials 1-19, 0-7 Ballyporeen, 24/5/2017, 
 Upperchurch-Drombane 3-13, 3-9 Cahir , 24/5/2017, 

Round 3
 Clonmel Commercials 3-17, 1-6 Upperchurch-Drombane, 17/6/2017, Report
 Ballyporeen 1-14, 0-14 Cahir, 17/6/2017, Report

Relegation play-off

Relegation Semi-Final

Relegation Final

Knockout stage

Preliminary Quarter Final
Arravale Rovers won the West Tipperary S.F.C. in 2017, and thus qualified for the Knock-out stage despite finishing third in Group B.

Quarter finals

Semi finals

Final

References

External links
Tipperary GAA Official Site

Tipperary Senior Football Championship
Tipperary Senior Football Championship